The Next Step is a Canadian teen drama series created by Frank van Keeken and produced by Temple Street Productions. Shot in a dramatic mockumentary style, the series focuses on a group of dancers who attend the Next Step Dance Studio. The series has broadcast a total of 219 episodes over eight seasons, airing from March 8, 2013.

Series overview

Episodes

Season 1 (2013–14)

Season 2 (2014–15)

Notes

Season 3 (2015)

Season 4 (2016–17)

Notes

Season 5 (2017)

Season 6 (2018–19)

Christmas special (2019)

Season 7 (2020)

Season 8 (2022)

Notes

References

External links
 

Lists of Canadian television series episodes